Melody for Two is a 1937 American musical film directed by Louis King and starring James Melton, Patricia Ellis and Marie Wilson.

The film is notable for introducing the song "September in the Rain", which subsequently became a pop standard. The film's art direction was by Esdras Hartley.

Plot

Cast

Reception

Critical response
Frank S. Nugent of The New York Times writes in his review: "Whipping itself into a fine orchestral frenzy, Melody for Two (at the Palace) posts tenor James Melton behind one swing band and alto Patricia Ellis behind another. As friendly enemies in the night clubs and over the airways they are prepared to fight it out, even if it takes all Summer. Mr. Melton has a pleasant voice for a few pleasant Warren and Dubin tunes and Miss Ellis and Wini Shaw handle their vocal stints easily. But nothing much ever happens—certainly nothing you can't afford to miss. Would it surprise you very much if we whispered that the rival bands and band leaders ultimately appear on twin stages for Delight cigarettes? We thought not. . . . The other half of the double bill is Café Metropole."

References

Sources

External links
 

1937 films
1937 musical films
American musical films
Films directed by Louis King
Warner Bros. films
American black-and-white films
1930s English-language films
1930s American films